Paul Ching Wu Chu (born February 12, 1941) is a Chinese-American physicist specializing in superconductivity, magnetism, and dielectrics. He is a Professor of physics and T.L.L. Temple Chair of Science in the Physics Department at the University of Houston College of Natural Sciences and Mathematics. He was the President of the Hong Kong University of Science and Technology from 2001 to 2009. In 1987, he was one of the first scientists to demonstrate high-temperature superconductivity.

Early life 
Chu was born in Changsha, Hunan, Republic of China in 1941. Chu's family was from Taishan, Guangdong. Chu spent his childhood in Taiwan.

Education 
In 1958, Chu graduated from Taiwan Provincial Cingshuei high school.

In 1962, Chu earned his Bachelor of Science degree from National Cheng Kung University in Taiwan. In 1965, Chu earned his Master of Science degree from Fordham University. In 1968, Chu earned his Ph.D. degree from the University of California, San Diego.

Career 
After two years of performing industrial research with Bell Laboratories at Murray Hill, New Jersey, Chu was appointed assistant professor of physics at Cleveland State University in 1970. He was subsequently promoted to associate professor and professor of physics in 1973 and 1975, respectively.

In 1979, Chu became a professor of physics at the University of Houston, which he still holds. That being said, the discovery touched off a frenzy of scientific excitement exemplified by the Woodstock of physics, at which he was a featured presenter. He was then appointed the director of the Texas Center for Superconductivity. Chu has served as the T.L.L. Temple Chair of Science at the same university since 1987. He also has served as a consultant and visiting staff member at Bell Laboratories, Los Alamos Scientific Laboratory, the Marshall Space Flight Center, Argonne National Laboratory, and DuPont at various times.

Chu has received numerous awards and honors for his outstanding work in superconductivity, including the National Medal of Science and the Comstock Prize in Physics in 1988, and the American Physical Society's International Prize for New Materials. He was an invited contributor to the White House National Millennium Time Capsule at the National Archives in 2000 and was selected the Best Researcher in the U.S. by U.S. News & World Report in 1990.

In 1989, Chu was elected a Fellow of the American Academy of Arts and Sciences. He is a member of the National Academy of Sciences, Chinese Academy of Sciences (foreign member), Academia Sinica, Russian Academy of Engineering (RAE) and the Third World Academy of Sciences. His research activities extend beyond superconductivity to magnetism and dielectrics.  

On November 17, 2014, an IEEE Milestone in Electrical Engineering and Computing plaque was presented to University of Houston for Chu and his team's 1987 discovery of high temperature superconductors.

On September 1, 2001, Chu succeeded Professor Chia-Wei Woo as the President of The Hong Kong University of Science and Technology. Chu's tenure as University President ended officially on 1 September 2009.

Awards and honors 
 Honorary Doctor of Science (Sc.D.) degree from Whittier College. (1991)
2014 IEEE Council on Superconductivity Max Swerdlow Award for Sustained Service to the Applied Superconductivity Community.

See also 
 Committee of 100 (United States)
 yttrium

Lectures 

 1991 - High temperature superconductivity: four years later  Lecture sponsored by the Dept. of Electrical and Computer engineering, University of California, San Diego. Electrical and Computer Engineering Distinguished Lecture Series. Digital Object Made Available by Special Collections & Archives, UC San Diego.

References

Additional sources 

.

External links 
 Paul Chu at uh.edu -at archive.org
 Paul C. W. Chu at ashk.org.hk
 Paul C. W. Chu at committee100.org
 Paul Ching-Wu Chu at encyclopedia.com

1941 births
Living people
Chinese emigrants to the United States
21st-century American physicists
Cleveland State University alumni
Fellows of the American Academy of Arts and Sciences
Fordham University alumni
Members of Academia Sinica
Members of Committee of 100
National Cheng Kung University alumni
National Medal of Science laureates
People from Changsha
American people of Chinese descent
University of California, San Diego alumni
University of Houston faculty
Presidents of the Hong Kong University of Science and Technology
Educators from Hunan
Scientists from Hunan
Members of the United States National Academy of Sciences
Foreign members of the Chinese Academy of Sciences
Fellows of the American Physical Society